Phạm Minh Chính (born 10 December 1958) is a Vietnamese politician and public security general. He is the current Prime Minister of Vietnam, one of the country's highest-ranked officials (along with the General Secretary of the Communist Party and the President of Vietnam).

A member of the Politburo of the Communist Party since 2016, Chính is also the Vice Chairman of the National Defense and Security Council of Vietnam. He is a Member of the National Assembly of Vietnam and a Lieutenant General of the People's Public Security Forces. 

He also served as the Party Secretary (Governor) of Quảng Ninh province (2011–2015), Deputy Minister of Public Security (2010–2011), Head of the MPS  (2010) and Deputy Head of the MPS  (2006–2009).

He holds a Bachelor of Civil Engineering, a Doctor of Law, and an Advanced Degree in Political Theory. Chính is also an Associate Professor of National Security Studies.

Early life and education
Phạm Minh Chính was born on 10 December 1958, at the commune of Hoa Lộc, Hậu Lộc district, Thanh Hóa province, North Vietnam, in a family of eight siblings. His father  was a local cadre and civil servant, and his mother was a farmer. In 1963, he followed his family to build a New Economic Zone in the town of Phong Sơn, Cẩm Thủy, Thanh Hóa. As a child, he attended Cẩm Thủy High School. After graduating from high school in 1975, he studied at Hanoi University of Foreign Studies, nowadays Hanoi University. In 1976, he was sent to Socialist Republic of Romania to study at Technical University of Civil Engineering of Bucharest. He studied Romanian and majored in Civil Engineering. In 2000, he successfully defended his Doctor of Law thesis, becoming a Doctor of Law. On March 9, 2010, he was conferred the academic title of Associate Professor in Law.

Phạm Minh Chính was admitted to the Communist Party of Vietnam on December 25, 1986, and became an official member on December 25, 1987. He also attended courses at Hồ Chí Minh National Academy of Politics, receiving an Advanced Degree in Political Theory.

Political career
In January 1985, Phạm Minh Chính became an Intelligence officer within the Department of intelligence within the Ministry of Public Security, among other things, he served as an intelligence officer in the Department of Europe and America within the department of intelligence during his time within the Department of Intelligence. In March 1991, Phạm Minh Chính became an officer of the Ministry of Foreign Affairs, working at the Vietnamese Embassy in Romania.

In November 1994, he returned to the Ministry of Public Security, becoming the Deputy Head of the Department of Europe. Between May 1999 and August 2010, he served as the Deputy Director of several departments, and in August 2010, he became a member of the Central Committee of the Communist Party of Vietnam at the 11th party Congress. He was Re-elected at the 12th party congress in February 2015. In February 2016, he became a member of the Politburo of the Communist Party of Vietnam.

Premiership

In early 2021, the 13th National Congress of the Communist Party of Vietnam takes place. Before and during the congress, foreign media suggested that Pham Minh Chinh would be the most likely new Prime Minister of Vietnam after the 13th National Congress of the Communist Party of Vietnam.

On 5 April 2021, he was elected as Prime Minister of Vietnam at the 11th working session of the 14th National Assembly.

COVID–19 pandemic

Fund for COVID-19 Prevention 

Facing the increasingly complicated situation of the COVID-19 pandemic in Vietnam, Vietnam needs more than 150 million doses of COVID-19 vaccine to vaccinate about 75 million people, with total funding needs estimated at more than 25 thousand billion. However, the Vietnamese economy is facing many difficulties, the need for funding for the purchase of vaccines is very large and the state budget is limited. Facing that situation, Prime Minister Phạm Minh Chính signed and promulgated Resolution 53/NQ-CP approving the establishment of a COVID-19 vaccine fund on May 27, 2021.

COVID-19 epidemic in southern provinces and cities 
Faced with the increasingly complicated epidemic situation in Ho Chi Minh City, Prime Minister Phạm Minh Chính requested the Ministry of Public Security, the Ministry of National Defense, the Ministry of Transport, the Ministry of Health and a number of localities with experience to The anti-epidemic experiment continued to support and prioritize the aid of warlike forces for Ho Chi Minh City during the online meeting on the morning of July 4, 2021. In the face of the situation that Ho Chi Minh City recorded more than 13,000 infections and during the period of social distancing within 15 days when implementing Directive 16 from July 9, 2021, Prime Minister Phạm Minh Chính directed to prioritize 25%  national vaccine for the city.  HCM City to strive to inject 2 million doses for city people by the end of July 2021.

Environmental problem
Phạm Minh Chính has had a dense and highly effective working program with dozens of bilateral and multilateral activities, contributing to enhancing Vietnam's position and prestige in the international arena.

The Prime Minister attended and delivered important speeches at the COP26 Conference, attended and spoke at events announcing the initiatives of a number of important partners on the sidelines of COP26 such as the announcement of the Global Methane Emission Reduction Commitment  demand, action on forests and land use

International Relations

France–Vietnam Relations

Vietnam and France are determined to bring cooperation frameworks between the two countries, from politics - diplomacy, security - defense to economy - trade - investment, science and technology, health care, education - training. creation, culture... continue to go deeper, more substantive and effective, and at the same time adapt to changes in the region and in the world. Towards the 50th anniversary of the establishment of diplomatic relations and the 10th anniversary of the establishment of a strategic partnership in 2023, the two sides agreed to jointly develop an annual plan with specific tasks, in order to bring Vietnam-Vietnam relations - France has grown to new heights.

Japan–Vietnam Relations
This is  the first time Fumio Kishida visits Vietnam after 6 months as Prime Minister of Japan and 5 months after Prime Minister Phạm Minh Chính's official visit to Japan.

The relationship between the two countries is considered to be very good. The two sides are actively preparing activities to celebrate the 50th anniversary of the establishment of diplomatic relations in 2023.

Family
Pham Minh Chinh has a son and a daughter. His younger brother - Pham Tri Thuc, used to hold the position of Vice Chairman of the National Assembly's Law Committee under the National Assembly Standing Committee, a member of the National Assembly of Vietnam XIII and XIV. Member of the Law Committee of the XIII and XIV National Assembly. His younger sister Director General of Internal Affairs (Department 4), Government Office.

References

External links 

 

Living people
1958 births
Prime Ministers of Vietnam
Members of the 12th Secretariat of the Communist Party of Vietnam
Members of the 12th Politburo of the Communist Party of Vietnam
Members of the 13th Politburo of the Communist Party of Vietnam
Members of the 11th Central Committee of the Communist Party of Vietnam
Members of the 12th Central Committee of the Communist Party of Vietnam
Members of the 13th Central Committee of the Communist Party of Vietnam
People from Thanh Hóa province